2020 Colorado Proposition 113 was a ballot initiative approved by voters in Colorado as part of the 2020 United States elections. The proposition was to join the National Popular Vote Interstate Compact.

Contents
The proposal appeared on the ballot as follows:

Polling

Results

The proposal was approved narrowly, with around 52% of the vote. The results of the proposal were highly correlated with the results of the concurrent presidential election. Every county that voted for Donald Trump voted against of the proposal, and all but two counties that voted for Joe Biden voted for the proposal.

See also
 List of Colorado ballot measures

References

2020 Colorado ballot measures
Electoral system ballot measures in the United States